Ame, AME, or AmE may refer to:

Companies and organizations
 African Methodist Episcopal Church
 African Methodist Episcopal Zion Church
 AME Accounting Software
 American Modern Ensemble, a music ensemble based New York City
 Ametek, American technology company
 Atelier Mécanique de Mulhouse, a French armament R&D facility in charge of light weapons design after WW2
 Club América, a professional football club based in Mexico City, Mexico

Occupations
 Aircraft Maintenance Engineer
 Aircraft maintenance engineer (Canada)
 Aviation medical examiner

People
 Ame (gamer) (born 1997), professional Chinese Dota 2 player 
 A*M*E (born 1994), singer-songwriter from Sierra Leone
 Saint Ame (died 630), Benedictine abbot and hermit who is also called Saint Amatus
 Saint Aimé (died 690), abbot of the Agaune monastery in Switzerland and bishop of the Sens (or Sion) diocese
Âme, house/techno duo consisting of Kristian Beyer and Frank Wiedemann

Other uses
 Absolutely maximally entangled state, in quantum information science 
 Adobe Media Encoder, a transcoder that is part of Adobe Creative Cloud
 âme, the sound post of a member of the viol or violin family
 American English
 AME VI, a type of reconnaissance plane built in Spain in 1924
 Amplitude modulation equivalent
 Apparent mineralocorticoid excess syndrome
 Saint-Amé, a commune in the Vosges department in Lorraine in northeastern France